Ard Sluis (born in the Netherlands) is a Dutch football manager who last worked as youth coach of DOS Kampen in his home country.

Career
Sluis started his managerial career with Warri Wolves in the Nigerian Professional Football League, a position he held until 2016. After that, he coached DOS Kampen.

References

External links 
 Ard Sluis: from crazy African adventures to the real thing
 'No clear favourite' for NPFL title, admits ex-Warri Wolves coach Sluis
 Former Sneker trainer in premier league Nigeria
 Three of these boys at Cambuur and they play for European football"
 Warri Wolves Coach Sluis: Finidi, Kanu Attracted Me To Nigeria

Living people
Year of birth missing (living people)
Dutch football managers
Dutch expatriate football managers
Expatriate football managers in Nigeria
Warri Wolves F.C. managers